Mount Moses is, at , the highest and most prominent of the Hudson Mountains of Antarctica, located near the center of the group, about  north-northeast of Mount Manthe. It was mapped from air photos taken by U.S. Navy Operation Highjump in 1946–47, and was named by the Advisory Committee on Antarctic Names for Robert L. Moses, a geomagnetist and seismologist at Byrd Station in 1967.

See also
 Mountains in Antarctica

References

Hudson Mountains
Mountains of Ellsworth Land
Volcanoes of Ellsworth Land
Miocene stratovolcanoes